Morgan Neville (born October 10, 1967) is an American film producer, director, and writer. His acclaimed film 20 Feet from Stardom won the Academy Award for Best Documentary Feature in 2014 as well as a Grammy Award for Best Music Film. His documentary Best of Enemies, on the debates between Gore Vidal and William F. Buckley, was shortlisted for the 2016 Academy Award and won an Emmy Award. His 2018 film Won't You Be My Neighbor?, a documentary about Fred Rogers, received critical acclaim and became the highest-grossing biographical documentary of all time.

Neville has been nominated for five additional Grammys for films including Respect Yourself: The Stax Records Story, Muddy Waters: Can’t Be Satisfied, Johnny Cash’s America, and The Music of Strangers: Yo-Yo Ma and the Silk Road Ensemble. Neville’s other films include The Cool School, Shotgun Freeway, Keith Richards: Under the Influence, and, as producer, Miss Americana, Beauty Is Embarrassing, and Crossfire Hurricane.

For television, Neville directed and executive produced the series Ugly Delicious, Abstract: The Art of Design, Chelsea Does, Shangri-La, and Song Exploder.

Biography and career 

Neville was born in Los Angeles, California, graduated from the University of Pennsylvania and originally worked as a journalist in New York City and San Francisco before moving into film production in 1993. He founded Tremolo Productions in 1999 and continues to run it today.

Neville's films focus on culture, and especially on music. Speaking about his 2016 film The Music of Strangers, Neville said "The best thing about it for me as a filmmaker ... is that not only do I get to indulge my musical love, but that music is, to me, the most amazing Trojan horse to tell any other kind of story. The best music films are not about music ... Music is just the language we're speaking to tell a story about culture."

Since finding success with his music-related documentaries, Neville has focused on other aspects of culture, such as politics and media. In a 2014 blog post on the International Documentary Association's website, Neville wrote that he is drawn to "how a smaller story can be a perfect window into conflicts within the human condition." His 2015 film Best of Enemies examines the televised debates between Gore Vidal and William F. Buckley and serves as a timely investigation into politics and media. His film Won't You Be My Neighbor, about legendary television host Fred Rogers, premiered at the Sundance Film Festival to rave reviews, and focuses on the power that kindness and understanding can have in a community, whether real or imagined.

Personal life 
Neville lives in Pasadena, California with his wife and two children.

Filmography (as director)

Feature-length films 
 Shotgun Freeway: Drives Through Lost L.A. (1995)
 Brian Wilson: A Beach Boy's Tale (1999)
 Sam Phillips: The Man Who Invented Rock'n'Roll (2000)
 Muddy Waters Can't Be Satisfied (2003)
 Hank Williams: Honky Tonk Blues (2004)
 The Cool School (2008)
 Johnny Cash's America (2008)
 Search and Destroy: Iggy & The Stooges' Raw Power (2010)
 Troubadours (2011)
 20 Feet from Stardom (2013)
 Best of Enemies: Buckley vs. Vidal (2015)
 The Music of Strangers (2015)
 Keith Richards: Under the Influence (2015)
 Won't You Be My Neighbor? (2018)
 They'll Love Me When I'm Dead (2018)
Roadrunner: A Film About Anthony Bourdain (2021)
 Mickey: The Story of a Mouse (2022) (producer)
 Man on the Run (TBA) 

 Television 
 Respect Yourself: The Stax Records Story (2007)
 Chelsea Does (2016)
 Abstract: The Art of Design (2017)
 Ugly Delicious (2018)
 Shangri-La (2019)
 Song Exploder (2020)
 Watch the Sound with Mark Ronson'' (2021)

References

External links

Tremolo Productions



1967 births
American film producers
Living people
Directors of Best Documentary Feature Academy Award winners
Film producers from California
University of Pennsylvania alumni
Grammy Award winners
Film directors from Los Angeles